Cassie LaRue Gaines (January 9, 1948 – October 20, 1977) was an American singer, best known for her work with Southern rock band Lynyrd Skynyrd.

Biography
Gaines was invited by JoJo Billingsley and Ronnie Van Zant to join Lynyrd Skynyrd as a backup singer. She had never heard of the band at the time, so Billingsley lent her a copy of the band's first two albums: (Pronounced 'Lĕh-'nérd 'Skin-'nérd) and Second Helping. In late 1975, Gaines, Billingsley, and Leslie Hawkins formed The Honkettes, a female gospel vocal trio for Skynyrd.

When Lynyrd Skynyrd was in need of a guitar player to replace recently departed Ed King, Cassie recommended her younger brother, Steve, who joined the band soon after.

Plane crash 

On October 20, 1977, a Convair CV-240 carrying the band between shows from Greenville, South Carolina to Baton Rouge, Louisiana crashed outside of Gillsburg, Mississippi. The crash killed Ronnie Van Zant, Steve and Cassie Gaines, assistant road manager Dean Kilpatrick, as well as pilot Walter McCreary and co-pilot William Gray. Though Cassie Gaines initially refused to board the flight, she was — against her better judgment — convinced to do so by other passengers. Her hesitation was due to a small fire in one of the engines the previous day. She intended to travel in the tour trucks but boarded the flight due to Van Zant's persuasion.

Gaines survived the initial accident but bled to death while rescuers attempted to reach the accident site and remove victims for medical treatment. According to controversial claims by survivor Billy Powell, Gaines bled to death after the accident in Powell's arms due to deep lacerations.

Burial 
Cassie and Steve Gaines were buried in Orange Park, Florida.

On February 15, 1979, the mother of Steve and Cassie, also named Cassie LaRue Gaines, was killed in an automobile accident near the cemetery where Steve and Cassie are buried. She was buried near her children.

References

External links
 

1948 births
1977 deaths
20th-century American singers
Accidental deaths in Mississippi
American rock singers
Burials in Florida
Lynyrd Skynyrd members
People from Seneca, Missouri
Victims of aviation accidents or incidents in the United States
Victims of aviation accidents or incidents in 1977
20th-century American women singers
Musicians killed in aviation accidents or incidents